Floral is an unincorporated community and census-designated place (CDP) in Independence County, Arkansas, United States. It was first listed as a CDP in the 2020 census with a population of 109. Floral has a post office with ZIP code 72534.

Education 
Since the 1985–86 school year, public education for elementary and secondary students has been provided by the Midland School District, which includes Midland Elementary School, which is located in Floral, and Midland High School, based in Pleasant Plains. Midland formed as a result of consolidation of the former Pleasant Plains and Floral school districts. The consolidation of the Pleasant Plains School District and the Floral School District was effective on July 1, 1985.

Demographics

2020 census

Note: the US Census treats Hispanic/Latino as an ethnic category. This table excludes Latinos from the racial categories and assigns them to a separate category. Hispanics/Latinos can be of any race.

References

External links
Encyclopedia of Arkansas History & Culture entry

Unincorporated communities in Independence County, Arkansas
Unincorporated communities in Arkansas
Census-designated places in Independence County, Arkansas